Norman Holroyd (8 May 1914 – 25 June 2002) was a British weightlifter. He competed in the men's featherweight event at the 1936 Summer Olympics.

In the 1930s, Holroyd trained at Bradford College Physical Culture Club. In April, 1937 he was the first English weightlifter to lift double his body weight using the clean and jerk method. Holroyd was British Champion nine times.

References

1914 births
2002 deaths
British male weightlifters
Olympic weightlifters of Great Britain
People associated with physical culture
Sportspeople from Halifax, West Yorkshire
Weightlifters at the 1936 Summer Olympics
20th-century British people